The women's singles in table tennis at the 2015 European Games in Baku was the 1st edition of the event in a European Games It was at the Baku Crystal Hall from 16 to 19 June 2015.

Qualification

Seeds
Seeds were based on the ITTF World Ranking lists published in June 2015.

Schedule
All times are Azerbaijan Summer Time (UTC+5)

Draw

Finals

Top half

Section 1

Section 2

Bottom half

Section 3

Section 4

External links
 
 
 
 

Women's singles
Euro